The position of Taylor Professor of the German Language and Literature (named after the architect Robert Taylor, whose bequest funded the Taylor Institution) is one of the permanent chairs at the University of Oxford. The position was established in 1907. It is associated with a fellowship at The Queen's College, Oxford. The people to have held the position are:

 Hermann Georg Fiedler 1907–1937
 James Boyd 1938–1959
 Ernest Stahl 1959–1969
 Siegbert Salomon Prawer 1969–1986
 Terence James Reed 1989–2004
 Ritchie Robertson 2010–2021
 Karen Leeder 2021–present

The post was renamed the 'Schwarz–Taylor Professor of the German Language and Literature' in 2020, following a donation from the Dieter Schwarz Foundation.

See also
 Taylor Institution, Oxford

References

1907 establishments in England
German Language and Literature, Schwarz-Taylor
German Language and Literature, Schwarz-Taylor
German-language education
The Queen's College, Oxford
Language education in the United Kingdom
Lists of people associated with the University of Oxford